Plagge is a surname. Notable people with the surname include:

Frank Plagge (born 1963), German footballer and manager
Karl Plagge (1897–1957)
Ludwig Plagge (1910–1948), German SS officer at Auschwitz, Buchenwald and Majdanek concentration camps executed for war crimes
Wolfgang Plagge (born 1960), Norwegian composer and pianist
Wolfgang Plagge (born 1956), German Karate Coach 3. DAN SHOTOKAN